The Fuzztones are an American garage rock revival band formed in 1982.

History
Founded by singer-guitarist Rudi Protrudi in New York City, the band has gone through several member changes but is currently active in Europe. Dismissed by some critics and listeners as a "bar band" or unoriginal, they maintained a strong fan base in New York, in Europe (with their music being played on Hungarian State Radio), and in Los Angeles.

Rudi Protrudi moved to Los Angeles in 1987, after the breakup of the original band, to organize a new Fuzztones, consisting of Jordan Tarlow (lead guitar), John "Speediejohn" Carlucci (bass guitar), Jason Savall (Vox combo organ), and "Mad" Mike Czekaj (drums). This lineup bears the distinction of being the only 1980's garage rock revival band to secure a major label record deal, when they signed to RCA.

The group's name is derived from Fuzz Tone, the commercial name of a guitar effect pedal invented in 1962 and whose distinctive sound was popularized in the 1965 hit song "(I Can't Get No) Satisfaction" by the Rolling Stones.

Members

Current members
Rudi Protrudi – lead vocals, guitar, harmonica
Lana Loveland – organ, backing vocals
Eric Geevers – bass, backing vocals
Marco Rivagli – drums, backing vocals

Current touring members
Nico Secondini – keyboards, backing vocals
Marcello Salis – guitar, backing vocals
Paul Rodas – bass

Founder members
Rudi Protrudi – vocals, guitar
Deb O'Nair – organ
Elan Portnoy – guitar
Michael Jay – bass
Michael Phillips – drums

Discography
Sources:

Studio albums
Lysergic Emanations (1985) #12 UK Indie
In Heat (1989)
Braindrops (1991)
Monster A-Go-Go (1992)
Salt for Zombies (2003)
Horny as Hell (2008)
Preaching to the Perverted (2011)
NYC (2020)
Encore (2022)

Live albums
Screamin' Jay Hawkins and the Fuzztones Live 12" EP (1984, United States Midnight Records MIRLP114B)
reissued in 2006 on 12" EP by Italy Get Back Records
reissued in 2015 on 12" LP by Cleopatra record USA (original four tracks on A side and bonus tracks on B side), also available on cd (same running time and track list)
Leave Your Mind at Home (12" EP, 1984, United States Midnight Records - MIRLP105)
reissued in 2006 on 12" EP by Italy Get Back Records
Lysergic Love/Lovely Sort of Death (1986, Furlined Vulcano/Purple Helmut) (bootleg live album)
Live in Europe! flexidisc (1987, Germany Music Maniac Records MM06)
reissued in 2006 on 12" LP with gatefold sleeve by Italy Get Back Records
First 1,000 copies contain one-sided 7-inch picture disc of the Glora flexidisc
Blue Themes/13 Women And The Only Man Around (1988, Mint Minus Records MMR666) live bootleg
Blue Theme (1987) - German bootleg of above
In Heat Tour souvenir 10" picture disc (1989, United Kingdom Situation Two Records SIT 61)
Lysergic Ejaculations CD (1994, Germany Music Maniac Records MM052)
LSD 25: 25 Years of Fuzz and Fury CD & DVD (2005, Sin 002 / Italy Get Back Records GET138)
Lord Have Mercy On My Soul (Recorded at Lincoln Lounge, Venice, CA. - 7" single, 2005, Twist, Twist 34)

Compilation albums
Creatures that Time Forgot (LP/CD,1989, Germany, Music Maniac - MMLP020/United States Skycad CD/LP HEAD 64CD/HEAD 64)
Teen Trash Vol. 4 12" LP/CD (1993, Germany Music Maniac MM88004)
Flashbacks (1996, Sundazed Music SC11045)
Lysergic Legacy – The Very Best Of (2013, Cleopatra Records)

Singles and EPs

Tributes and other appearances
Illegitimate Spawn double CD (Tribute album to The Fuzztones featuring 42 bands - 2006, Sin Records SIN003)
Songs We Taught The Fuzztones 2xCD (Original versions of songs played by the Fuzztones - 1989, Germany Music Maniac MMCD 66002)
The Fuzztones Boom 10"EP/CD (The Sonics tribute album - 2006, Beyond Your Mind Records)
A1 - Caught You Red-Handed 		
A2 - Cinderella 		
A3 - The Witch 		
B1 - Have Love Will Travel		
B2 - Strychnine 		
B3 - Boss Hoss

Compilation appearances
The Rebel Kind (1983, Sounds Interesting Records)
includes the song "Ward 81"
New York Freakout flexidisc (1984, 99th Floor fanzine & Venus Records)
includes the song "99th Floor", also tracks by Plasticland and The Vipers
Battle of the Garages Vol.2 (Voxx Records/BOMP Records 200-019)
includes the song "Green Slime"
Hanging Out at Midnight (1984, United States Midnight Records MIDLP 127)
includes the song "The Witch"
Garage Sale cassette (1985, United States ROIR CASSETTE A135)
includes the song "Cinderella"
Skullfuck 7" EP (1987, Germany Glitterhouse Records GR 0027)
Free with Glitterhouse magazine
includes a live recording of the song "Brand New Man"
also tracks by Broken Jug, The Fluid, and The Politicians
Lost Trails 7" EP (included with Lost Trails fanzine)
Gimmick double 12" LP (Germany Music Maniac MMLP 023)
For Your Longhair Party 7" EP (1992, Aishna Ash Records 202)
includes the song "Be a Caveman"
Cavestomp! Volume 1 CD (1998, Cavestomp Records 001)
includes the song "She's Wicked"
R.A.F.R. Volume 3 CD (2000, R.A.F.R. Records RAFR011)
Las Vegas Shakedown CD (2000, Masked Superstar Recordings 001)
includes the song "A Wristwatch Band"
Be a Caveman: The Best of the Voxx Garage Revival CD (2004, Voxx Records VCD2073)
Todos Somos Ramones CD (2004, Rockaway Records)
Evil Fuzz (2005, Om Om Music RBKB9 B9)
Lost in Tyme CD (included with 2005 issue of Lost in Tyme magazine)
includes the song "They're Gonna Take You Away"
Children of Nuggets four-CD box set (2005, Rhino Records RT74639)
includes the song "Bad News Travels Fast"
Psychedelica Volume I double CD (2006, Northern Star Records NS1)
Halloween Garage Rock (2009, Garage Masters Records)
includes the song "She's Wicked"
Psych-Out Christmas (2013, Cleopatra Records)
includes the song "Santa Claus"
Summer Bash 2019 (2019, Soundflat Records)
includes "Alexander" (previously unreleased version), "Land of Nod" (feat. Steve Mackay), "This Game Called Girl" and "Invisible".

References

External links 

The Fuzztones on Facebook
 
The Fuzztones on Rate Your Music
Official Page of Rudi Protrudi

Garage punk groups
Garage rock groups from New York (state)
Psychedelic rock music groups from New York (state)
Musical groups established in 1981
Situation Two artists